Primož Čučnik (born 1 June 1971) is a Slovene poet, editor and translator. He has published numerous poetry collections.

Čučnik was born in Ljubljana in 1971. He studied philosophy and sociology of culture at the University of Ljubljana and works as an editor at the literary journal Literatura.

He won the Prešeren Foundation Award in 2008 for his poetry collection Delo in dom and the Jenko Award in 2011 for his poetry collection Kot dar. In 2012 he won the Veronika Award for his collection entitled Mikado.

Poetry collections

 Dve zimi (1999)
 Ritem v rôkah (2002)
 Oda na manhatanski aveniji (2003)
 Akordi (2004)
 Nova okna (2005)
 Sekira v medu:izbrane pesmi (2006)
 Delo in dom (2007)
 Kot dar (2010)
 Mikado (2012)

Essays
Spati na krilu (2008)

References

Slovenian poets
Slovenian male poets
Slovenian editors
Slovenian translators
Living people
1971 births
Writers from Ljubljana
University of Ljubljana alumni